José Luís Anica Costa (born 26 January 1984) is a Portuguese sailor. He and Jorge Lima placed 16th in the 49er event at the 2016 Summer Olympics.

References

External links
 
 
 

1984 births
Living people
People from Tavira
Portuguese male sailors (sport)
Olympic sailors of Portugal
Sailors at the 2016 Summer Olympics – 49er
Sailors at the 2020 Summer Olympics – 49er
Sportspeople from Faro District